2009 F.C. Gifu season

Competitions

Player statistics

Other pages
 J. League official site

Gifu
2009